Phytoecia aspericollis is a species of beetle in the family Cerambycidae. It was described by Holzschuh in 1981.

References

Phytoecia
Beetles described in 1981